Glenn Dicterow (born December 23, 1948), is an American violinist and former concertmaster of the New York Philharmonic Orchestra. He is on the faculty of the University of Southern California's Thornton School of Music where he holds the Jascha Heifetz Chair in Violin as well as serving as a faculty artist at the Music Academy of the West.

Dicterow's musical gifts became apparent when, at age 11, he made his solo debut with the Tchaikovsky Violin Concerto with the Los Angeles Philharmonic Orchestra. Harold Dicterow, his father, served as principal of the second violin section in the Los Angeles Philharmonic for 52 years. Over the following years, Dicterow became one of the most sought-after young violinists, appearing as soloist from coast to coast.

Dicterow went on to win numerous awards and competitions, including the Young Musicians Foundation Award and Coleman Award (Los Angeles), The Julia Klumpke Award (San Francisco), and the Bronze Medal in the International Tchaikovsky Competition (1970). He is a graduate of The Juilliard School, where he was a student of Ivan Galamian. Other teachers have included Erno Neufeld, Eudice Shapiro, Naoum Blinder, Manuel Compinsky, Jascha Heifetz and Henryk Szeryng.

Career 
In 1967 he appeared as soloist with the New York Philharmonic under the baton of Andre Kostelanetz in the Tchaikovsky Violin Concerto. He was then 18 years old. In 1980 he joined the Orchestra as Concertmaster and has since performed as soloist every year. Prior to joining the New York Philharmonic, Dicterow served as Associate Concertmaster and Concertmaster of the Los Angeles Philharmonic. During a New York Philharmonic tour of major American cities in 1986, Dicterow was featured in Leonard Bernstein's Serenade with the composer conducting. In 1990 he played the Carmen Fantasy by Waxman under the direction of Zubin Mehta in a Live from Lincoln Center concert telecast. In 1982, Dicterow was a soloist in the Orchestra's concert at the White House.

In recent years, Dicterow has been the featured soloist with the New York Philharmonic in Prokofiev's Second Violin Concerto with guest conductor Yuri Temirkanov, Gian Carlo Menotti's Violin Concerto under the direction of Kurt Masur, and Bruch's Violin Concerto No. 1 with Christian Thielemann. During the Philharmonic's 1998 Asian Tour, he was soloist in the Barber Violin Concerto in Manila, Korea, and in Beijing, China, where he performed in The Great Hall of the People to an audience of more than 10,000 people. In the 2005–06 season, he was the soloist in Mozart's Violin Concerto No. 3, K.216 with Bramwell Tovey conducting, and Mozart's Serenade No. 7 in D major, K.248B, "Haffner", with Sir Colin Davis. In the 2006–07 season he played the Brahms Double Concerto with Philharmonic Principal Cello Carter Brey in New York and on the Orchestra's 2007 European Tour.

Dicterow has also been a guest soloist with the symphony orchestras of Los Angeles, Baltimore, Birmingham, Chautauqua, Grant Park, Indianapolis, Kansas City, Mexico City, Miami, Montreal, Omaha, and Tampa, to name a few. More recent engagements have included solo concerts with the Leipzig Gewandhaus Orchestra, Hong Kong Philharmonic, and the Bernstein Serenade with the Curtis Symphony Orchestra in "Isaac Stern at Eighty: A Birthday Celebration" at Carnegie Hall. In February 2002, he performed Miklós Rózsa's Symphonie Concertante and the Wagner-Waxman Tristan Fantasy with Leonard Slatkin and the National Symphony Orchestra. Upcoming activities include an October, 2006 appearance with the San Diego Symphony, led by Jahja Ling, in Bruch's Violin Concerto No. 1 in G minor; a recital at the University of Texas in January, 2007; and a performance with the Kalamazoo Symphony Orchestra in February 2007.

On May 24, 2012, Dicterow announced that he would step down as concertmaster of the New York Philharmonic to join the full-time faculty at the University of Southern California. Joining faculty members such as Midori, Ralph Kirshbaum and a host of other renowned faculty members, Dicterow acquired the first Robert Mann Endowed Chair in Violin and Chamber Music at the University of Southern California's Thornton School of Music. The appointment began in the Fall of 2013, although Dicterow stayed with the New York Philharmonic through the end of the 2013-2014 season. Later in March 2022, the Thornton School of Music bestowed the highest honor possible to a faculty member in the Strings Department: Dicterow was named the Jascha Heifetz Chair in Violin.

Discography 
Dicterow's discography includes Aaron Copland's Violin Sonata, Largo, and Piano Trio; Charles Ives's Sonatas Nos. 2 and 4 and Piano Trio; and Erich Wolfgang Korngold's Piano Trio and Violin Sonata, all for EMI. He is also featured in the violin solos in Richard Strauss's Ein Heldenleben and Also sprach Zarathustra with Zubin Mehta for CBS. Other compositions committed to disc are works of Wieniawski with Zubin Mehta and the Los Angeles Philharmonic; Lee Holdridge's Violin Concerto with the London Symphony Orchestra and Holdridge conducting; Shostakovich's Violin Concerto No. 1 with the New York Philharmonic conducted by Maxim Shostakovich on a Radiothon recording; and the Philharmonic's recording of Rimsky-Korsakov's Scheherazade with Yuri Temirkanov on the BMG label. Dicterow's most recent CD is a solo recital for Cala Records entitled New York Legends, featuring John Corigliano's Sonata for Violin and Piano, Erich Wolfgang Korngold's Much Ado About Nothing, the premiere recording of Leonard Bernstein's Sonata for Violin and Piano, and Bohuslav Martinu's Three Madrigals for violin and viola, in collaboration with violist Karen Dreyfus and pianist Gerald Robbins. He currently appears on Navona Records.

Filmography 
Dicterow can also be heard in the violin solos of the film scores for:
The Turning Point
The Untouchables
Altered States
Aladdin
Beauty and the Beast
Interview with the Vampire

Other musical interests 
In addition to concertizing, Dicterow enjoys an active teaching career. He was on the faculty of The Juilliard School and Manhattan School of Music. He and his wife, violist Karen Dreyfus, are founding members of The Lyric Piano Quartet, which was in residence at Queens College, City University of New York. In 2013, both Dicterow and Dreyfus left New York to join the full-time faculty at the USC Thornton School of Music.
He also contributed to Madonna's 1992 album Erotica with the song In This Life, leading the strings in this orchestral song.

References

External links 
 Dicterow's General Management Schmidt Artists International

1948 births
20th-century classical violinists
21st-century classical violinists
American classical violinists
Male classical violinists
American male violinists
Concertmasters of the New York Philharmonic
Juilliard School alumni
Juilliard School faculty
Living people
Manhattan School of Music faculty
Music Academy of the West faculty
Musicians from Los Angeles
USC Thornton School of Music faculty
Classical musicians from California
20th-century American male musicians
21st-century American male musicians
20th-century American violinists
21st-century American violinists